Sugitania is a genus of moths of the family Noctuidae.

Species
 Sugitania lepida (Butler, 1879)

References
Natural History Museum Lepidoptera genus database
Sugitania at funet

Cuculliinae